The In-Laws (simplified Chinese: 麻婆斗妇) is a Singaporean Chinese drama which was telecasted on Singapore's free-to-air channel, MediaCorp Channel 8. It stars Louise Lee, Rui En, Pierre Png, Cynthia Koh,  Darren Lim, Belinda Lee & Jin Yinji as the casts of the series. It made its debut on 12 April 2011 and has ended on 30 May 2011. This drama serial consists of 35 episodes, and was screened on every weekday night at 9:00 pm. This drama serial was repeated on every Monday to Wednesday at 3:30 pm.

It stars the award-winning veteran Hong Kong actress Louise Lee who also acted in the locally produced Portrait of Home back in 2005.

The series title 麻婆斗妇 (ma po dou fu, literally translates as "old lady fights daughter-in-law") is a play on a spicy tofu and beef dish from Sichuan called "Pockmarked Lady's Beancurd" (麻婆豆腐).

Cast

Xiao's family

Wang's family

Others

Awards & nominations

See also
 List of The In-Laws (TV series) episodes

References

External links

 

Singapore Chinese dramas
2011 Singaporean television series debuts
2011 Singaporean television series endings
Channel 8 (Singapore) original programming